Andrei Alexandru Patache (born 29 October 1987) is a Romanian footballer who plays as a right back for Liga I club FC Botoșani.

Club career
He made his debut on the professional league level in the Liga I for Botoșani on 21 July 2013 as a starter in a game against CFR Cluj.

In the 2015-2016 season, he debuted in the Europa League in the Botosani jersey.

Honours
Botoșani
Liga II: 2012–13

References

External links
 
 

Living people
1987 births
Sportspeople from Botoșani
Romanian footballers
Association football defenders
FC Botoșani players
CS Concordia Chiajna players
Liga I players
Liga II players
21st-century Romanian people